This list of the tallest buildings and structures in Newcastle upon Tyne ranks skyscrapers and structures in Newcastle upon Tyne, England, UK, by height and doesn't include structures in neighbouring Gateshead. Unlike other cities in the UK of its size, Newcastle upon Tyne doesn't have a particularly large number of highrise buildings and structures, the majority are residential tower blocks built in the mid-20th century. 

St Nicholas' Cathedral, which was completed in 1448 held the title of the tallest building in Newcastle for 396 years until 1844 when St Mary's Cathedral succeeded it by a matter of metres. St Mary's Cathedral also held the title of the city's tallest building for 122 years. In 1966 the first modern building to exceed the height of Newcastle's two cathedrals became the tallest building in the city. Despite this, Shieldfield House held the title for only a two-year period when construction of the 28-storey Vale House was completed in 1968. Newcastle City Council granted planning permission in 2017 for an 82-metre-tall residential block to be called Hadrian's Tower on Rutherford Street in Newcastle city centre, which became the new tallest on its completion in 2020.

Tallest buildings and structures
An equal sign (=) following a rank indicates the same height between two or more buildings.

Tallest under construction, approved and proposed

Proposed

References

External links
SkyscraperNews: Newcastle upon Tyne

Newcastle upon Tyne
 
Tallest buildings
Tallest